Senator Woodyard may refer to:

Harry C. Woodyard (1867–1929), West Virginia State Senate
Harry Woodyard (Illinois politician) (1930–1997), Illinois State Senate

See also
Senator Woodard (disambiguation)